Walkerian is an eponym and may refer to:

Richard Walker (philosopher) (1679–1764), professor of moral philosophy
Alice Walker (born 1944), American author